1609 Brenda, provisional designation , is a stony asteroid from the central region of the asteroid belt, approximately 28 kilometers in diameter. It was discovered on 10 July 1951, by South African astronomer Ernest Johnson at the Johannesburg Observatory in South Africa, and named after his granddaughter, Brenda.

Orbit and classification 

The S-type asteroid orbits the Sun in the central main-belt at a distance of 1.9–3.2 AU once every 4 years and 2 months (1,518 days). Its orbit has an eccentricity of 0.25 and an inclination of 19° with respect to the ecliptic. Its observation arc begins 17 years prior to its official discovery observation, with its identification , also made at Simeiz.

Physical characteristics 

American astronomer Richard Binzel obtained the first rotational lightcurve of Brenda in June 1984. It gave a rotation period of 19.46 hours with a brightness variation of 0.16 magnitude.

According to the surveys carried out by the Infrared Astronomical Satellite IRAS, the Japanese Akari satellite, and NASA's Wide-field Infrared Survey Explorer with its subsequent NEOWISE mission, Brenda measures between 26.27 and 29.64 kilometers in diameter, and its surface has an albedo between 0.115 and 0.133. The Collaborative Asteroid Lightcurve Link derives an albedo of 0.1078 and a diameter of 29.59 kilometers with an absolute magnitude of 10.68.

Naming 

This minor planet was named by the discoverer for his granddaughter, Brenda. The official  was published by the Minor Planet Center on 20 February 1976. Ernest Johnson is also known for the discovery of the periodic comet 48P/Johnson, using the Franklin-Adams Star Camera.

References

External links 
 Asteroid Lightcurve Database (LCDB), query form (info )
 Dictionary of Minor Planet Names, Google books
 Asteroids and comets rotation curves, CdR – Observatoire de Genève, Raoul Behrend
 Discovery Circumstances: Numbered Minor Planets (1)-(5000) – Minor Planet Center
 
 

001609
Discoveries by Ernest Leonard Johnson
Named minor planets
19510710